The 2008 World Orienteering Championships, the 25th World Orienteering Championships, were held in Olomouc in the Czech Republic, 10 –20 July 2008.

The championships had eight events; sprint for men and women, middle distance for men and women, long distance (formerly called individual or classic distance) for men and women, and relays for men and women.

Medalists

References 

World Orienteering Championships
2008 in Czech sport
International sports competitions hosted by the Czech Republic
July 2008 sports events in Europe
Orienteering in the Czech Republic
Sport in Olomouc